The men's 1500 metre freestyle event at the 1998 Commonwealth Games was held at KL Sports City.

Records 
Prior to this competition, the existing world, Commonwealth and Games records were as follows:

Results

Heats

Final

References

Men's 1500 metre freestyle